Phoolbagan metro station (or LIC Phoolbagan metro station for sponsorship reasons) is a station of the Kolkata Metro in Phoolbagan, a north neighbourhood of Kolkata, India.  The underground station is at the Phoolbagan crossing on the Narkeldanga Main Road. It is near to the Gurudas College and Dr. Shyamaprasad Mukherjee Institution. The station opened on 4 October 2020 and commercial services started the next day.

History

Construction

The Station

Structure 
This is the first underground station in this line and has island platforms.

Layout

Connections

Rail 
  is 500m away from the metro station.

Air 
Netaji Subhash Chandra Bose International Airport is  via VIP Road & C.I.T Road.

See also
List of Kolkata Metro stations

References 

Kolkata Metro stations
Railway stations in Kolkata